Garry Lewis Jr. (born August 25, 1967) is a former American football defensive back who played four seasons in the National Football League (NFL) with the Los Angeles Raiders, Tampa Bay Buccaneers and Kansas City Chiefs. He was drafted by the Raiders in the seventh round of the 1990 NFL Draft. He played college football at Alcorn State University and attended Walter L. Cohen High School in New Orleans, Louisiana. Lewis was also a member of the Ottawa Rough Riders and Hamilton Tiger-Cats of the Canadian Football League.

References

External links
Just Sports Stats

Living people
1967 births
Players of American football from New Orleans
Players of Canadian football from New Orleans
American football defensive backs
Canadian football defensive backs
African-American players of American football
African-American players of Canadian football
Alcorn State Braves football players
Los Angeles Raiders players
Tampa Bay Buccaneers players
Kansas City Chiefs players
Ottawa Rough Riders players
Hamilton Tiger-Cats players
21st-century African-American people
20th-century African-American sportspeople